John Macaulay was a Scottish footballer who played as a forward.

Career
Macaulay played club football for Arthurlie, and made one appearance for Scotland in 1884.

References

Year of birth missing
Place of birth missing
Scottish footballers
Scotland international footballers
Arthurlie F.C. players
Association football forwards
Year of death missing
Place of death missing